Miruru is a name that can refer to:
Miruru, an artificial intelligence from the anime Onegai Teacher
Miruru, a character from the third Sgt. Frog anime movie